Mother of God Cemetery, Covington, Kentucky, was first located at 26th Street and Madison Avenue in 1849, and was moved to its current location at 2701 Latonia Avenue in 1887. The old cemetery was also known as the Buena Vista Cemetery or St Joseph Cemetery. Some of the graves were moved from the old cemetery, while others were not.

This cemetery was founded as the parish cemetery for Mother of God Parish, Covington's second oldest, which served a German-speaking population. This cemetery evolved from a parish cemetery to a regional one and remains active today.

Frank Duveneck, noted Covington artist, rests in this cemetery; his memorial is by artist Clement Barnhorn, whose Crucifixion Scene is also found in the cemetery.

Pro basketball player Larry Staverman (1936–2007) is buried there.

A listing of graves in this cemetery is available at the Kenton County Public Library in Covington.

References

External links
 
 
 
 Duveneck monument
 Old Mother of God Cemetery
 Covington Cemeteries
 Notes on Mother of God Cemetery from the Kenton County Library
 Example of tombstones in German in the Mother of God Cemetery, Wisker Family Plot
 Discover Northern Kentucky: Mother of God Cemetery Part I
 Discover Northern Kentucky: Mother of God Cemetery Part II
 Discover Northern Kentucky: Mother of God Cemetery Part III

Cemeteries in Kentucky
Buildings and structures in Covington, Kentucky
German-American history
German-American culture in Kentucky
Protected areas of Kenton County, Kentucky
1849 establishments in Kentucky